Thiry is a surname. Notable people with the name include:

Bruno Thiry (born 1962), Belgian rally driver
Jean Bastien-Thiry (1927–1963), attempted to assassinate French President Charles de Gaulle
Jules Thiry (1898–1931), Belgian water polo player
Louis Thiry (born 1935), French organist, composer and pedagogue
Marcel Thiry (1897–1977), French-speaking Belgian poet
Paul Thiry (architect) (1904–1993), known as the father of modernism in the Pacific Northwest

See also
Thiery (surname)
Thierry, given name and surname